Cauto Cristo is a municipality and town in the Granma Province of Cuba. It is located on the banks of the Río Cauto, in the western part of the province, bordering the provinces of Holguín and Las Tunas.

Demographics
In 2004, the municipality of Cauto Cristo had a population of 21,159.

See also
Municipalities of Cuba
List of cities in Cuba

References

External links

Populated places in Granma Province